The 1948 United States presidential election in Rhode Island took place on November 2, 1948, as part of the 1948 United States presidential election. State voters chose four electors to the Electoral College, which selected the president and vice president.

Rhode Island was won by Democratic candidate, incumbent President Harry S. Truman of Missouri, over the Republican candidate, Governor Thomas E. Dewey of New York. Truman ran with Senator Alben W. Barkley of Kentucky as his running mate, while Dewey ran with Governor Earl Warren of California as his running mate.

Truman won Rhode Island by a margin of 16.15%.

Results

By county

See also
 United States presidential elections in Rhode Island

References

1948
Rhode Island
1948 Rhode Island elections